Prince Philip Challenge Cup was a rowing event for men's coxed fours at the annual Henley Royal Regatta on the River Thames at Henley-on-Thames in England.

The event ran from 1963 until 2003 but was withdrawn due to declining interest internationally.

Winners

References

Events at Henley Royal Regatta
Rowing trophies and awards
1963 establishments in England
2003 disestablishments in England